WAKY (620 kHz AM) is a classic hits radio station in the Louisville, Kentucky metropolitan area that simulcasts WAKY-FM (103.5 MHz FM). It is currently owned by William Walters, through licensee W & B Broadcasting Co., Inc. The station used to share a significant portion of Spanish programming with sister station WTUV-FM (105.7 FM) until WTUV-FM was sold to UB Louisville and became English-language sports radio station WHBE-FM. The original station call letters, under different owners, were WTMT (1958–2010) with country music and, later, sports formats.

WAKY is also simulcast on FM translators W261CO (100.1 FM) and W292FS (106.3 FM) in Louisville. 100.1 W261CO serves Louisville inside the Interstate 264 (Watterson/Shawnee Expressway) corridor (along with New Albany, Clarksville, and Jeffersonville in Southern Indiana), while 106.3 W292FS serves Jeffersontown and Lake Forest.

The station was assigned the WAKY call letters by the Federal Communications Commission on April 1, 2015. On May 3, 2015, the format was changed to a simulcast of WAKY-FM, rebroadcasting their classic hits format. The WAKY call letters are evocative of the famous WAKY (790 kHz), a nationally influential Top 40 music station in Louisville (under other ownership, including McLendon Radio, Multimedia and LIN Broadcasting) from 1958 to late 1985. Currently, the WAKY-AM-FM studios are south of the Fort Knox Army Reservation in Radcliff, Kentucky, about 27 miles south of Louisville. The WAKY AM transmitter and antenna are located in the Oak Park area of Jeffersonville, Indiana.

External links

FCC History Cards for WAKY

AKY
1958 establishments in Kentucky
Radio stations established in 1958
Classic hits radio stations in the United States